Nicolás Fernández de Moratín (1737–1780) was the father of one of the most important Spanish writers and dramatists of the neoclassical era, Leandro Fernández de Moratín. He himself was involved in the Spanish literary movement of the day and heavily influenced his son. He wrote Arte de las putas, a poem, and La petimetra, a new comedy. He was also a member of the Tertulia de la Fonda de San Sebastián where he met famous authors like José Cadalso and Tomás de Iriarte.

References
 List of writings
 Arte de las putas. Madrid: 1898.
 Desengaños al teatro español. Madrid: 1762-3.
 La Diana, o arte de la caza. Madrid: 1765.
 Guzmán el Bueno. Madrid: Antonio de Sancha, 1777.
 Hormesinda. Madrid: Pantaleón Aznar, 1770.
 Lucrecia. Madrid: José Francisco Martínez Abad, 1763. 
 La Petimetra. Madrid: Viuda de Juan Muñoz, 1762.

External links
 
 

1737 births
1780 deaths
18th-century Spanish writers